The seventh season of the Syfy reality television series Face Off premiered on July 22, 2014. The season features 16 prosthetic-makeup artists competing against each other to create makeup effects. This season will have a specific theme, 'Life and Death'. 

In this season, the contestants faced a Sudden Death challenge, when, during the first episode, it was revealed that the contestants' first challenge is actually their final audition to be on the show.

Prizes for this season include US$100,000, a 2014 Fiat 500, and a VIP trip to one of Kryolan's makeup locations.  Dina Cimarusti of Chicago, Illinois won this season in the end.

Recurring people
 McKenzie Westmore - Host
 Michael Westmore - Mentor

Judges
 Lois Burwell
 Ve Neill appears as a judge in only three episodes due to The Hunger Games commitments.
 Glenn Hetrick
 Neville Page

Contestants

Contestant progress

 
Color key:

 The contestant won Face Off.
  The contestant was a runner-up.
 The contestant won a Spotlight Challenge.
 The contestant was part of a team that won the Spotlight Challenge.
 The contestant was in the top in the Spotlight Challenge.
 The contestant was declared one of the best in the Spotlight Challenge but was not in the running for the win.
 The contestant was in the bottom in the Spotlight Challenge.
 The contestant was a teammate of the eliminated contestant in the Spotlight Challenge.
 The contestant was eliminated.
 The contestant was deemed the least successful but was saved by the judges and was not eliminated.
‡ The contestant won the Foundation Challenge.

Episodes

References

External links

 
 

2014 American television seasons
Face Off (TV series)